Khaled El Sheikh (or Khalid Al-Shaikh; born 23 September 1958) is a Bahraini singer.  Married with 5 daughters (Dareen, Noor, Marwa, Samawa, and Wanas). Honored in 12th Bahrain International Musical Festival on 14 October 2003.
Honored by Culture & Arts Directorate, Ministry of Information for best music and sound effects for Akhbar AlMajnoon play on 6 July 2005.

Education and early career

El Sheikh graduated from high school in Bahrain in 1975. He then relocated to Kuwait and was enrolled in Kuwait University, majoring in Economic & Political Sciences. During his second year in college, opting to follow his passion for music; he dropped out of college in 1978 and travelled to Egypt with the intent to study at the Higher Institute for Music (Conservatoire) in Cairo. There, Khaled studied musical composition for one year (1979–1980).

In 1979, he returned to Bahrain and was appointed as Oud Instructor at Bahrain Music Institute, before taking up a governmental post at the Ministry of Information until 1998.

Collaborations with prominent artists ignited Khaled's career, with compositions to fellow Bahraini singer Mohammad Aljumairi, in addition to participating in musical composition for a significant number of plays dedicated to children.

A milestone in Khaled's career was the composition he provided for the song Shuwaiekh Mn Ardh Meknes by Aljumairi in 1982. The unprecedented success of the song cemented Khaled's status as one of the pillars of music in the Persian Gulf region.

In 1983, he released his debut album, heavily written in formal Arabic, which was extremely uncommon at the time.

Participation in festivals 
Khalid Al Sheikh received numerous awards and certificates of appreciation and honor throughout his career:
A certificate of appreciation and honor of the festival of Eid art Iraq 1985 
A guest of honor and appreciation in the Arab Song Festival VI, primarily in Bahrain 1996 
Testimony in honor of the Bahrain International Festival XI Music Bahraini October 2003 
The prize for best music and sound effects, "the formation of music and songs" 2005 
Shield pilot astronauts Arab music in the Doha Song Festival VIII January 2007

Songs and music works 
Own albums:
Kulama Kunta Bequrbi, 1983.
Mudeer Al Rah, 1984.
Ya Ubaid, 1985.
Kamanjeh, 1986.
Naam Naam, 1987.
Abu Ishaq, 1988.
Elab Elab, 1989.
Gazali, 1991.
Atash El Nakheel, 1992.
Faces (Wojooh), 1997.
Impossible (Mustaheel), 1998.
Safe Place for Love (Makan Aamen Lelhub), 2000.
Rehlat Elgajar, 2002.
Sabah El Lail, 2004.
Esmi Wa Meladi, 2005.

Theater play works 
Land that does not grew flowers.
Birds Home.
Children Visits Al Maari.
Laila & Wolf.
Hamama Nudi Nudi.
Wonderland.
Al Baraha.
Bee & Lion.
Drums.
Boby dog Story.

TV works 
Alwafaa Night, Kuwait TV.
Ibn Akl, Bahrain TV.
Bu Jassim Sons, Bahrain TV.
Malfa AlAyaweed, Bahrain TV.
Hassan & Noor AlSana, Bahrain TV.
Sadoon, Bahrain TV.
Neeran, Bahrain TV.
Ramadhaniyat, Bahrain TV.
Sadeem, Bahrain TV., 2002.
Suwalef Dunya, Qatar TV, 2005.

Shows 
Awal (In the occasion of Sultan Qabus Visit).
Sada AlAshwaq.
Greeting to Abu Salman.
Causway of Love (In the occasion of King Fahad).
Muharraq (In the occasion of King Hamad Visit).

Songs for Arab singers 
- Bahrain:
Ahmed AlJumairi
Ebrahim Habib
Abdulla BuQais
Jassim AlHarban
Husam Ahmed
Huda Abdulla
Mohammed Abdul Rahim
Mahmoud Hussain
Hend
Adel Mahmoud
Jaffar Habib
Mohammed AlBakri
Mohammed Yousif
Aref AlZayani

- Kuwait:
Mustafa Ahmed
Abdulla Al Ruwaished
Greed ElShatei
AlAnood
Mohammed AlBalooshi

- Qatar:
Ali AbdulSatar

- Oman:
Ahmed AlHarthi
Hakeem Aayel
Mohammed Al Makheeni
Salem Mahaad
Samah
El Yaqubi

- UAE:
Abdulla BalKhair
Ruwaida AlMahrooqi

- Saudi Arabia:
Abdul Majeed Abdulla
Rashid Al Majid
Abdulla Rashad
Adel Kamis

- Morocco:
Raja BalMaleeh

- Egypt:
Gada Rajab
Angam

- Tunisia:
Nawal Gasham

External links 
– A safe place for love: http://www.alshaikh.com
– Forums Khalid AlSheikh: http://www.khalidalshaikh-fans.com
– Musical Library for Khalid AlSheikh: http://www.khalidalshaikh-fans.com/music_library/index.htm

1958 births
Living people
20th-century Bahraini male singers
Rotana Records artists
21st-century Bahraini male singers